Antero Diogo da Silva Ferreira (born 7 February 1990) known as Diogo Vila, is a Portuguese footballer who plays for Amarante as a defender.

References

1990 births
People from Amarante, Portugal
Living people
Portuguese footballers
Association football defenders
F.C. Infesta players
Padroense F.C. players
AEK Larnaca FC players
Associação Naval 1º de Maio players
Liga Portugal 2 players
F.C. Felgueiras 1932 players
S.C. Freamunde players
C.D. Cinfães players
Amarante F.C. players
Merelinense F.C. players
FC Etzella Ettelbruck players
Portuguese expatriate footballers
Portuguese expatriate sportspeople in Cyprus
Expatriate footballers in Cyprus
Cypriot First Division players
Portuguese expatriate sportspeople in Luxembourg
Expatriate footballers in Luxembourg
Sportspeople from Porto District